Callambulyx rubricosa, the large pink-and-green hawkmoth, is a species of moth of the family Sphingidae first described by Francis Walker in 1856.

Distribution 
It is known from the Nepal, north-eastern India, south-western China, Thailand, Vietnam and Java.

Description 
The wingspan is about 132 mm. It is very similar to Callambulyx amanda, but the hindwing upperside lacks a prominent black marking near the tornus.

Subspecies
Callambulyx rubricosa rubricosa (Nepal, north-eastern India, south-western China, Thailand and Vietnam)
Callambulyx rubricosa piepersi (Snellen, 1880) (Laos and Java)

References

External links
A checklist of hawk moths, Family Sphingidae of Thailand บัญชีรายชื่อผีเสื้อจรวดของประเทศไทย

Callambulyx
Moths of Asia
Moths described in 1856